South Korean girl group T-ara has held five tours since its debut in 2009, four of which were in Japan. T-ara's X'mas Premium Live was a 3-day tour promoting the group's first and second Japanese singles "Bo Peep Bo Peep (JPN ver.)" and "Ya Ya Ya (JPN ver.)", respectively. The Osaka concert was recorded and later released on the Diamond Edition of T-ara's first Japanese album Jewelry Box. The T-ara Great China Tour kicked off in Shanghai in December 2014 and concluded in the same city in September 2016. The tour marked T-ara's first concerts in Hefei and Nanjing.

Tours

One-off concerts

Home Media 
Rights to several T-ara concerts were licensed and sold / aired (Live and re-broadcast) to different distributors. In August 2011, T-ara's First Showcase In Japan was aired on Japan's largest broadcasting satellite Sky Perfect TV.

In 2011, T-ara's First Showcase In Japan received a nationwide 3D screening in Japan by Warner production which operates 498 screens nationwide.

Comeback showcases

Fan meetings

Award shows

Festivals

Joint tours and concerts

Guest performances

TV Shows & Specials

Notes

References 

T-ara
T-ara